Finally, Betty Carter is a live album by Betty Carter. Though it was recorded in 1969, its release was delayed until 1975 because the master recording was stolen. A second album of material recorded from the same concert, Round Midnight, was released the same year.

Track listing
Medley: "Seems Like Old Times"/"I Remember You"/"Remember" (Johnny Mercer, Victor Schertzinger)/(Irving Berlin) - 8:25
"Blue Moon" (Lorenz Hart, Richard Rodgers) - 2:03
"The Sun Died" (Ray Charles, Hubert Giraud, Anne Gregory) - 5:29
"I Only Have Eyes for You" (Al Dubin, Harry Warren) - 2:27
Medley: "Body and Soul"/"Heart and Soul" (Edward Heyman, Robert Sour, Frank Eyton, Johnny Green) (Hoagy Carmichael, Frank Loesser) - 8:58
Medley: "I Didn't Know What Time It Was"/"All the Things You Are"/"I Could Write a Book" (Rodgers, Hart)/(Oscar Hammerstein II, Jerome Kern)/ (Rodgers, Hart) - 5:52
"Girl Talk" (Neal Hefti, Bobby Troup) - 5:46
"You're a Sweetheart" (Harold Adamson, Jimmy McHugh) - 4:40
"Ego" (Betty Carter, Randy Weston) - 3:23
"All Through the Day" (Hammerstein, Kern) - 8:39

Personnel

Recorded December 6, 1969, Judson Hall, New York City, New York, USA

 Betty Carter - vocals
 Norman Simmons - piano
 Lisle Atkinson - bass
 Al Harewood - drums

References

Betty Carter live albums
1976 live albums
albums produced by Alan Douglas (record producer)
Roulette Records live albums